The 1987 Brazilian motorcycle Grand Prix was the penultimate round of the 1987 Grand Prix motorcycle racing season. It took place on the weekend of 26–27 September 1987 at the Autódromo Internacional Ayrton Senna.

Classification

500 cc

References

Brazilian motorcycle Grand Prix
Brazilian
Motorcycle Grand Prix